Maximilian August Hermann Julius von Laffert (10 May 1855 in Lindau – 20 July 1917 in Frankfurt am Main) was a Saxon officer, later General of Cavalry during World War I. He was a recipient of the Pour le Mérite.

Maximilian von Laffert suffered a heart attack while commanding his troops in France and died later in Frankfurt on 20 July 1917. He is interred at the Nordfriedhof in Dresden.

Awards
 Iron Cross of 1914, 1st and 2nd class
 Pour le Mérite (1 September 1916)
 Order of the Crown, 4th class (Prussia)
 Commander 2nd class of the Military Order of St. Henry (31 July 1916); previously awarded the Knight's Cross on 9 September 1914
 Order of the Red Eagle, 4th class
 Commander of the House Order of the White Falcon
 Commander 1st class of the Albert Order
 Commander 2nd class of the Saxe-Ernestine House Order
 Commander, 1st Class of the Civil Order of Saxony
 Service Award (Saxony)
 Military Merit Order, 2nd class with star (Bavaria)
 Commander, 1st Class of the Order of Henry the Lion (Brunswick)
 Knight's Cross, 1st Class of the Friedrich Order (Württemberg)

Footnotes

References
 Karl-Friedrich Hildebrand, Christian Zweig: Die Ritter des Ordens Pour le Mérite des I. Weltkriegs Band 2: H-O, Biblio Verlag, Bissendorf 2003, S.285-287

1855 births
1917 deaths
People from Lindau
People from the Kingdom of Bavaria
German Army generals of World War I
Saxon generals
Recipients of the Pour le Mérite (military class)
Recipients of the Iron Cross (1914), 1st class
Burials at the Nordfriedhof (Dresden)
Military personnel from Bavaria